Apocalypse of James may refer to:

First Apocalypse of James
Second Apocalypse of James
Apocalypse of James (Syriac)